Elections for the President and National Administration Council were held alongside indirect Senate elections in Uruguay on 28 November 1926. The three factions of the Colorado Party received 49% of the vote, whilst the National Party received 48%.

Results

References

Elections in Uruguay
Uruguay
General
Uruguay
Election and referendum articles with incomplete results